The Forno Glacier (Romansh: Vadrec del Forno) is a 6 km long glacier (2005) situated in the Bregaglia Range in the canton of Graubünden in Switzerland. In 1973 it had an area of 8.72 km2.

See also
List of glaciers in Switzerland
List of glaciers
Retreat of glaciers since 1850
Swiss Alps

External links
Swiss glacier monitoring network

Glaciers of Graubünden
Glaciers of the Alps
Bregaglia